Treculia is a genus of trees in the plant family Moraceae that is native to west and central Africa and Madagascar.  The best-known member of the genus, Treculia africana, commonly known as the African breadfruit, is used as a food plant.

The fruits are hard and fibrous, can be the size of a volleyball and weight up to 8.5 kg. Chimpanzees have been observed to use tools to break the fruits into small pieces that they can eat.

Species
Treculia 
Treculia africana
•Treculia africana subsp. africana Decne. ex Trec.
•Treculia africana subsp. africana cultivar. Nutreculia Nutrecul-TRC  
•Treculia africana subsp. madagascarica (N.E. Br.) C.C. Berg 
•Treculia africana var. ilicifolia (Leandri) C.C. Berg 
•Treculia africana var. inversa J.C. Okafor 
•Treculia africana var. mollis (Engl.) Léonard 
•Treculia africana var. sambiranensis (Leandri) C.C. Berg 
Treculia lamiana Leandri
Treculia obovoidea N. E. Br.

References

 
Moraceae genera